Geoffrey Herbert Beale MBE, FRS (11 June 1913 – 16 October 2009) was a British geneticist.
He founded the Protozoan Genetics Unit, at University of Edinburgh.

Life
He grew up in Wandsworth, London, and attended Sutton Grammar School. Influenced by The Science of Life edited by H. G. Wells, he took life sciences as a direction. He earned a first-class honours degree, from Imperial College London, in 1935, and PhD in 1938.
He worked at the John Innes Institute, with J. B. S. Haldane.

In World War II, he served in the Intelligence Corps, at the British mission to Murmansk.
He worked at Cold Spring Harbor Laboratory.

Family
He married Betty; they had three sons.

References

British geneticists
Alumni of University College London
British Army personnel of World War II
1913 births
2009 deaths
Fellows of the Royal Society
Members of the Order of the British Empire